The 2011–12 Czech Women's First League was the 19th season of the Czech Republic's top-tier football league for women. Sparta Praha were the defending champions and successfully defended their title.

Changes from 2010–11
The league was reduced from nine to eight teams.
After the regular season a championship round and a relegation round was introduced. The points of the regular season are halved.

Format
The eight teams will play each other twice for a total of 14 matches per team. After that the top four teams will play a championship round for another six matches per team. The bottom placed four teams play the relegation round. The champion qualifies for the UEFA Champions League.

Regular season

Standings

Results

Final stage
Points of the regular season were halved and rounded up, goal difference was kept.

Championship group
Played by the teams placed first to fourth of the regular season. Teams play each other twice.

Relegation group
Played by the teams placed fifth to eighth of the regular season. Teams play each other twice.

Relegation play-off
Eighth place Baník Ostrava played a two-legged play-off against Slovan Liberec. Liberec had won the second league promotion play-off against Jihlava 9–2 on aggregate. Baník Ostrava then won the relegation play-off 5–4 on aggregate and remained in the first division.

References

External links
football.cz
Season on soccerway.com

2011–12 domestic women's association football leagues
2011–12 in Czech football
Czech Women's First League seasons